Sterlin Gilbert (born August 11, 1978) is an American football coach and former player. He was most recently the offensive coordinator at Syracuse University, a position he assumed in January 2020.  Gilbert played college football at Angelo State University, where was a two-time All-Lone Star Conference selection at quarterback.  He served as the offensive coordinator at Eastern Illinois University from 2012 to 2013, Bowling Green State University in 2014, the University of Tulsa in 2015, the University of Texas at Austin in 2016, and the University of South Florida from 2017 to 2018.

Coaching career

Texas
In 2015, Gilbert was hired by Charlie Strong at the University of Texas at Austin as offensive coordinator and quarterbacks coach until the end of the 2016 season.

University of South Florida
After Charlie Strong's termination from the University of Texas, Gilbert followed Strong to USF. His overall offensive style received, criticism, as he was over reliant on halfback dive plays and did not attempt to open up the field, causing breakdowns against better defenses. Despite this, he rode the benefits of USF legend Quinton Flowers to 10 wins. In 2018, Gilbert's offense experienced early success with transfer QB Blake Barnett, before his scheme and injuries along the OL resulted in frequent sacks and eventual injury to Barnett, resulting in widespread calls for Gilbert's termination.

McNeese State
On December 5, 2018, Sterlin Gilbert was named the head football coach at McNeese State University, consequently avoiding potential termination by USF. In 2019, Gilbert led McNeese State to a 7-5 regular-season record.

Syracuse
In January 2020, Gilbert was hired by Dino Babers at Syracuse University as offensive coordinator and quarterbacks coach. He was not retained on staff after the 2021 season.

Head coaching record

College

References

External links
 McNeese State profile
 Tulsa profile

1978 births
Living people
American football quarterbacks
Angelo State Rams football players
Bowling Green Falcons football coaches
Eastern Illinois Panthers football coaches
Houston Cougars football coaches
McNeese Cowboys football coaches
South Florida Bulls football coaches
Syracuse Orange football coaches
Texas Longhorns football coaches
Tulsa Golden Hurricane football coaches
High school football coaches in Texas
People from San Angelo, Texas
Coaches of American football from Texas
Players of American football from Texas